KJCQ may refer to:

 KFBU-LD, a defunct low-power television station (channel 40) formerly licensed to serve Helena, Montana, United States, which held the call sign KJCQ-LP in 2014 and KJCQ-LD from 2014 to 2020
 KWLK, a radio station (88.5 FM) licensed to serve Westwood, California, United States, which held the call sign KJCQ from 2003 to 2013